ASAT can mean:

 Anti-satellite weapon
 ASM-135 ASAT, an air-launched anti-satellite multi-stage missile
 Aspartate aminotransferase, an enzyme in amino acid metabolism
 Association for Science in Autism Treatment, an organization promoting applied behavior analysis and other autism therapies
 G&L ASAT, an electric guitar